Gojko Pijetlović (born 7 August 1983) is a Serbian water polo player who plays as goalkeeper for VK Novi Beograd and the Serbia men's national water polo team.

He was voted the best goalkeeper of 2014 European Championship. He was a member of the Serbian teams that won Olympic gold medals in 2016 and 2020, and a bronze medal at the 2012 Olympics. He held the world title in 2009 and 2015 and the European title in 2014, 2016 and 2018.

Honours

Club
VK Partizan
 National Championship of Serbia: 2001–02, 2006–07, 2007–08
 National Cup of Serbia: 2001–02, 2006–07, 2007–08

Cattaro
 LEN Cup: 2009–10

Personal life
Pijetlović is married to Iva, with whom he has daughter and son. His younger brother Duško Pijetlović is yet another Serbian prominent water polo player.

See also
 Serbia men's Olympic water polo team records and statistics
 List of Olympic champions in men's water polo
 List of Olympic medalists in water polo (men)
 List of men's Olympic water polo tournament goalkeepers
 List of world champions in men's water polo
 List of World Aquatics Championships medalists in water polo

References

External links

 
 Gojko Pijetlović at Water Polo Association of Serbia (archived)
 

1983 births
Living people
Sportspeople from Novi Sad
Serbian male water polo players
Water polo goalkeepers
Water polo players at the 2012 Summer Olympics
Water polo players at the 2016 Summer Olympics
Water polo players at the 2020 Summer Olympics
Medalists at the 2012 Summer Olympics
Medalists at the 2016 Summer Olympics
Medalists at the 2020 Summer Olympics
Olympic gold medalists for Serbia in water polo
Olympic bronze medalists for Serbia in water polo
World Aquatics Championships medalists in water polo
European champions for Serbia
Competitors at the 2009 Mediterranean Games
Mediterranean Games medalists in water polo
Mediterranean Games gold medalists for Serbia
Serbian expatriate sportspeople in Hungary
Serbian expatriate sportspeople in Montenegro
Serbian expatriate sportspeople in Switzerland